The 2005 Tour de Georgia was the third annual bicycle road racing event held in the state of Georgia, United States. However, Danielson in 2012, was disqualified due to doping.

New Zealander Greg Henderson (Health Net Pro Cycling Team Presented by Maxxis) claimed the points jersey for sprinters, while Discovery Channel's José Luis Rubiera won the King of the Mountains competition for climbers. Trent Lowe (Jittery Joe's–Kalahari) won the Best Young Rider (blue jersey) competition.

Stage Winners Progress

Yellow Jersey Progress

Final Results

General Classification

Points Classification

King of The Mountains Classification

Most Aggressive Rider Classification
The Most Aggressive Rider wears the blue and green jersey. The jersey is awarded at the end of each stage to the rider that demonstrates  the most aggressive attacks, breakaways or strategies, as judged by a panel of media and race entourage officials.

Best Young Rider Classification
The Best Young Rider wears the green jersey. The jersey is awarded daily in the same manner as the general classification, which is by the overall placement at the finish line after each stage, with the least amount of overall accumulated time.

Team competition 
  
(and in no particular order)
UCI ProTour Teams
  
  Phonak Hearing Systems
  Saunier Duval–Prodir
  
  Team Gerolsteiner

UCI Professional Continental Teams
  Health Net Pro Cycling Team Presented by Maxxis
  Navigators Insurance Cycling Team
  Team L.P.R.
  Colavita Olive Oil-Sutter Homes Wines Cycling Team
  Kodakgallery.com–Sierra Nevada Pro Cycling Team
  Jittery Joe's–Kalahari Cycling Team
  Jelly Belly–Pool Gel
  Team TIAA–CREF
  National Cycling Team
  Symmetrics

References
cyclingnews
Tour de Georgia official site
Tour de Georgia blog

Tour de Georgia
Georgia
2005 in American sports